The Svalbard Global Seed Vault is a secure backup facility for the world's crop diversity on the Norwegian island of Spitsbergen in the remote Arctic Svalbard archipelago. The Seed Vault provides long-term storage of duplicates of seeds conserved in genebanks around the world. This provides security of the world's food supply against the loss of seeds in genebanks due to mismanagement, accident, equipment failures, funding cuts, war, sabotage, disease and natural disasters. The Seed Vault is managed under terms spelled out in a tripartite agreement among the Norwegian government, the Crop Trust, and the Nordic Genetic Resource Center (NordGen).

Norway and the Crop Trust pay for operational costs. Storing seeds in the vault is free to depositors. The vault has been depicted in several films and other art forms, including Marcus Paus’ children's opera Children of Ginko.

History

In 1984, the Nordic Gene Bank (now NordGen) began storing backup Nordic plant germplasm via frozen seeds in an abandoned coal mine outside of Longyearbyen.

In 2001, the International Treaty on Plant Genetic Resources for Food and Agriculture (ITPGRFA) was adopted and national governments began to ratify the Treaty soon after. The Treaty establishes a multilateral system for plant genetic resources that includes providing access to the materials and providing mechanisms so that those who use the resources can share any derived benefits.

A team led by conservationist Cary Fowler, in association with CGIAR, actively campaigned for the development of the Seed Vault and approached the Norwegian Government. They conducted a feasibility study in 2004 and concurred that Svalbard was an appropriate location for long-term storage. 

Also in 2004, the ITPGRFA entered into force and created the legal framework for having one international security facility. The FAO Commission on Genetic Resources for Food and Agriculture endorsed the initiative and in October 2004 the Norwegian Government committed to fund the Seed Vault and begin the construction.

The Seed Vault officially opened on 26 February 2008, although the first seeds arrived in January 2008. 

As part of the Seed Vault's first anniversary, more than 90,000 food crop seed samples were placed into storage, bringing the total number of seed samples to 400,000. Among the new seeds included were 32 varieties of potatoes from Ireland's national genebanks and 20,000 new samples from the U.S. Agricultural Research Service. Other seed samples came from genebanks in Canada and Switzerland as well as international genebanks in Colombia, Mexico and Syria. This  shipment brought the total number of seeds stored in the Seed Vault to over 20 million. As of this anniversary, the Seed Vault contained samples from approximately one-third of the world's most important food crop varieties. Also as part of the anniversary, experts on food production and climate change met for a three-day conference in Longyearbyen.

Japanese sculptor  presented a work to the Seed Vault named "The Seed 2009 / Momi In-Situ Conservation". 

In 2010, a delegation of seven U.S. congressmen handed over a number of different varieties of chili pepper.

By 2013, approximately one-third of the genera diversity stored in genebanks globally was represented at the Seed Vault.

In 2015 researchers started sending seeds from the Middle East for safeguarding in Svalbard due to ongoing conflicts. 

In October 2016, the Seed Vault experienced an unusually large degree of water intrusion due to higher than average temperatures and heavy rainfall. While it is common for some water to seep into the Seed Vault's  entrance tunnel during the warmer spring months, in this case the water encroached  into the tunnel before freezing. The Seed Vault was designed for water intrusion and as such the seeds were not at risk. As a result, however, the Norwegian public works agency Statsbygg completed improvements to the tunnel in 2019 to prevent any such intrusion in the future, including waterproofing the tunnel walls, removing heat sources from the tunnel, and digging exterior drainage ditches.

For the Seed Vault's 10th anniversary on 26 February 2018, a shipment of 70,000 samples was delivered to the facility, bringing the number of samples received to more than one million (not counting withdrawals). 

According to The Independent, as of March 2020, the COVID-19 pandemic does not pose a risk to the vault "as there are no permanent staff at the Svalbard facility."

As of June 2021, the Seed Vault conserves 1,081,026 distinct crop samples, representing more than 13,000 years of agricultural history.

Construction

Norway, Sweden, Finland, Denmark, and Iceland's prime ministers ceremonially laid "the first stone" on 19 June 2006.

The seed bank is  inside a sandstone mountain on Spitsbergen Island, and employs robust security systems. The facility is managed by the Nordic Genetic Resource Center, though there are no permanent staff on-site.

Spitsbergen was considered ideal because it lacked tectonic activity and had permafrost, which aids preservation.

A feasibility study prior to construction determined that the Seed Vault could preserve most major food crops' seeds for hundreds of years. Some, including those of important grains, could potentially remain viable for thousands of years.

Running the length of the facility's roof and down the front face to the entryway is an illuminated artwork named Perpetual Repercussion by Norwegian artist Dyveke Sanne that marks the location of the vault from a distance. In Norway, government-funded construction projects exceeding a certain cost must include artwork. KORO, the Norwegian State agency overseeing art in public spaces, engaged the artist to propose an artwork for the Seed Vault. The roof and vault entrance are filled with highly reflective stainless steel, mirrors, and prisms. The installation reflects polar light in the summer months, while in the winter, a network of 200 fibre-optic cables gives the piece a muted greenish-turquoise and white light.

Mission
The Seed Vault's mission is to provide a backup against accidental loss of diversity in traditional genebanks. While the popular press has emphasized its possible utility in the event of a major regional or global catastrophe, the Seed Vault will be more frequently accessed when genebanks lose samples due to mismanagement, accident, equipment failures, funding cuts, and natural disasters. These events occur with some regularity. War and civil strife have a history of destroying some genebanks. The national genebank of the Philippines was damaged by flooding and later destroyed by a fire, the genebanks of Afghanistan and Iraq have been lost completely, while an international genebank in Syria became unavailable. According to The Economist, "the Svalbard vault is a backup for the world's 1,750 seed banks, storehouses of agricultural biodiversity." 

Norwegian law has prohibited the storing of genetically modified seeds at the vault.

The adjacent Arctic World Archive provides a similar service for data, which is etched as code into reels of film. Project lead Piql of Norway states that the film, when properly preserved, should last for 1,000 years.

Tripartite agreement 
The Seed Vault is managed under terms spelled out in a tripartite agreement among the Norwegian Government, the Crop Trust, and the Nordic Genetic Resource Center (NordGen). The Kingdom of Norway owns the Seed Vault. The Crop Trust provides funding for ongoing operations and provides financial assistance to depositors in their preparation of shipments. NordGen operates the Seed Vault and maintains the public database of the deposits.

An International Advisory Council provides guidance and advice. It includes representatives from the FAO, CGIAR, the International Treaty on Plant Genetic Resources and other institutions.

Access to seeds

Vault seed samples are copies of samples stored in the depositing genebanks. Researchers, plant breeders, and other groups wishing to access seed samples cannot do so through the Seed Vault; they must instead request samples from the depositing genebanks. The samples stored in the genebanks will, in most cases, be accessible in accordance with the terms and conditions of the International Treaty on Plant Genetic Resources for Food and Agriculture, approved by 148 countries or parties.

The Seed Vault functions like a safe deposit box in a bank. The bank owns the building and the depositor owns the contents of their box. The Government of Norway owns the facility and the depositing genebanks own the seeds they send. The deposit of samples in Svalbard does not constitute a legal transfer of genetic resources. In genebank terminology this is called a "black box" arrangement.  Each depositor signs a Deposit Agreement with NordGen, acting on behalf of Norway. The Agreement makes clear that Norway does not claim ownership over the deposited samples and that ownership remains with the depositor, who has the sole right of access to those materials in the seed vault. No one has access to anyone else's seeds from the seed vault. The database of samples and depositors is maintained by NordGen.

The Syrian civil war created a situation where the black box arrangement was demonstrated. As a result of the conflict, the International Center for Agricultural Research in the Dry Areas (ICARDA) was unable to maintain its genebank located at Tel Hadya, Syria and therefore unable to distribute samples. In 2015, ICARDA withdrew some of the backup samples it had stored at the Seed Vault so that it could regenerate those seeds. ICARDA made a second and larger withdrawal in 2017. These seeds were planted in fields in Lebanon and Morocco and multiplied. Some were then returned to the Seed Vault while others were added to ICARDA's genebanks in Lebanon and Morocco so they could be conserved and distributed. These are the only withdrawals from the Seed Vault as of June 2021.

Seed storage

The seeds are stored in sealed three-ply foil packages and then placed into plastic tote containers on metal shelving racks. The low temperature and limited access to oxygen will ensure low metabolic activity and delay seed ageing. The permafrost surrounding the facility will help maintain the low temperature of the seeds if the electricity supply fails. 

Initially the Seed Vault would have some minor water intrusion at its entrance during the annual spring permafrost thawing. Warmer temperatures and heavy rainfall in October 2016 caused significantly greater amounts of water to seep into the entrance, but the facility's design ensured that the water froze after several meters and the seeds were not endangered. Work completed in 2019 eliminated this water seepage.

Attached to the seed boxes are a type of nanofilm that hold information on seed identity and other valuable information.

Crop Trust
The Crop Trust, officially known as the Global Crop Diversity Trust, plays a key role in the planning of the Seed Vault and coordinating shipments of seed samples to the Seed Vault in conjunction with the Nordic Genetic Resource Center. The Crop Trust provides most of the annual operating costs for the facility and has set aside an endowment fund to do so, while the Norwegian government finances upkeep of the structure itself. With support of its donors, the Crop Trust assists selected genebanks in developing countries as well as the international agricultural research centres in packaging and shipping seeds to the Seed Vault.

Awards and honors
Svalbard Global Seed Vault ranked at No. 6 on Times Best Inventions of 2008.  It was awarded the Norwegian Lighting Prize for 2009. It was ranked the 10th most influential project of the past 50 years by the Project Management Institute.

Capacity
Seeds are stored in airtight aluminium bags. The number of seeds in each bag will vary depending on the size of the seed, but on average each bag will contain approximately 500 seeds. The facility has a storage capacity of 4.5 million seed samples.

The table below presents the cumulative total of samples (i.e. accessions) deposited by year.

Depositors
As of June 2021, 87 depositors safeguard their crop samples in the Seed Vault. The below table lists the top international genebanks followed by the top regional and national genebank in terms of the number of samples currently deposited in the Seed Vault.

Indigenous communities 
Depositors to the Seed Vault are not limited to international, regional and national genebanks. Some indigenous communities have deposited seeds for safety duplication in the Seed Vault. In 2015, representatives of the Parque de la Papa in Peru deposited 750 samples of potatoes. In 2020, the Cherokee Nation became the first US tribe to deposit when it safeguarded nine samples of heirloom food crops which predate European colonization.

Cultural depictions
The Seed Vault was the inspiration for Ibsen International's art project "The Seed", supported by the Norwegian government. The children's opera Children of Ginko by Marcus Paus, which aimed to raise ecological awareness, "reveal the power of nature and celebrate children's courage in growing up", was created as part of this project.

The Seed Vault was featured in "The Futurama Holiday Spectacular" which aired on 21 November 2010.

The Seed Vault is featured in the second season of the Belgian Netflix TV series Into the Night and in the first season of its Turkish spin-off, the Netflix series Yakamoz S-245, both of which are based on the novel The Old Axolotl by Jacek Dukaj.

In Season 4 of The Last Ship, seeds taken from the seed vault are contested over by multiple factions as they hold the key to stopping a global famine.

In Season 3 of 2016 MacGyver "Seeds + Permafrost + Feather" the team head to Greenland, where a man working in a highly secure international seed vault has vanished without a trace. Upon arrival, the team finds a dead body and one packet of seeds missing from a North Korean crate, the seeds being for a pea pod whose plant can be synthesized into a deadly poison.

In Season 3 of the TV series Scorpion, titled "Dirty Seeds, Done Dirt Cheap," the protagonists travel to Greenland for a simple job, repairing a malfunctioning system at the Granse World Seed Vault.

The vault is depicted in the second season of  DuckTales in the episode "Raiders of the Doomsday Vault!".

In the Bobiverse books by Dennis E Taylor the Seed Vault has been improved to the Svalbard Global Trust, which also has genetic material from most Earth animals, and is critical to the attempts to move humans into colonies on other planets.

Science fiction author Stephen Baxter has used the Seed Vault, described as the "Svalbard vault", in his novels Flood and Ark. The vault is first purchased by a millionaire as the world floods, and then cached aboard a starship to take Earth life to new worlds.

See also
Arctic policy of Norway
Arctic World Archive
Center of origin
Frozen zoo, a similar concept, but for animals
National Ice Core Laboratory
Amphibian Ark
Coral reef organizations
Rosetta Project
Indian Seed Vault
Millennium Seed Bank Partnership
Orthodox seed
Recalcitrant seed
Survivalism

References

External links

Svalbard Global Seed Vault by the Norwegian Ministry of Agriculture and Food
Svalbard Global Seed Vault by the Crop Trust
Svalbard Global Seed Vault by the Nordic Genetic Resource Center (NordGen)
Online searchable database of deposits at NordGen

Gene banks
Seed associations
Conservation projects
Longyearbyen
Science and technology in Svalbard
2008 establishments in Norway
2008 in the environment
Emergency management in Norway
Disaster recovery
Protected areas of Svalbard
Tunnels in Norway
Norwegian companies established in 2008
Agricultural organisations based in Norway
Buildings and structures in Svalbard